Sipili Falatea (born 6 June 1997) is a French rugby union player, who plays as a tighthead prop for Bordeaux Bègles.

His nephew is French international rugby player Yoram Moefana, who plays for Bordeaux Bègles too as a centre.

Early life and career
Originally from Futuna, Sipili Falatea was born into a rugby household with his brother Tapu Falatea and his nephew Yoram Moefana being professional rugby players. He arrived in Metropolitan France in 2015 thanks to his brother, joining Colomiers academy.

Sipili Falatea was recruited by Top 14 club Clermont in the summer of 2017.

In July 2022, he joined Bordeaux Bègles from the 2022-23 Top 14 season until 2024.

International career
Falatea was called by Fabien Galthié to the French national team for the first time in June 2021, for the summer tour of Australia.

International tries

References

External link
France profile at FFR

1997 births
Living people
French rugby union players
ASM Clermont Auvergne players
Union Bordeaux Bègles players
Rugby union players from Wallis and Futuna
Rugby union props
France international rugby union players